The 1911 Penn Quakers football team was an American football team that represented the University of Pennsylvania in the 1911 college football season. In their third season under head coach Andy Smith, the Quakers compiled a 7–4 record and outscored opponents by a total of 131 to 83. Fullback Leroy Mercer was selected as a first-team All-American by Tommy Clark and Wilton S. Farnsworth.

Schedule

References

Penn
Penn Quakers football seasons
Penn Quakers football